José Anilton Júnior (July 10, 1980), known as just Anilton, is a Brazilian centerback who is a player and team captain with Portuguese club União de Leiria. He has also played in Brazil and Romania.

References

External links

1980 births
Living people
Brazilian footballers
Brazilian expatriate footballers
Primeira Liga players
Liga Portugal 2 players
Association football defenders
Expatriate footballers in Portugal
Brazilian expatriate sportspeople in Portugal
Expatriate footballers in Romania
Brazilian expatriate sportspeople in Romania
Liga I players
C.D. Aves players
S.C. Braga players
CS Pandurii Târgu Jiu players
Portimonense S.C. players
Moreirense F.C. players
U.D. Leiria players